The Cervicos Limestone is a geologic formation in the Dominican Republic. It preserves fossils dating back to the Late Oligocene period, as Orthaulax aquadillensis and Clypeaster concavus.

See also 
 List of fossiliferous stratigraphic units in the Dominican Republic

References

Further reading 
 T. W. Vaughan, W. Cooke, D.D. Condit, C.P. Ross, W.P. Woodring and F.C. Calkins. 1921. A geological reconnaissance of the Dominican Republic. Geological Survey of the Dominican Republic Memoir 1

Geologic formations of the Caribbean
Geology of the Dominican Republic
Paleogene Caribbean
Limestone formations